The European and Developing Countries Clinical Trials Partnership (EDCTP) is a partnership between the European Union (EU), Norway, Switzerland and developing countries and other donors, as well as the pharmaceutical industry, to enable clinical trials and the development of new medicines and vaccines against HIV/AIDS, tuberculosis, and malaria. The need for global action against these diseases in order to promote poverty reduction has been recognised by the United Nations, the G8, and the African Union, and the program envisioned the provision of €600 million for the period 2003–2007 in order to translate medical research results into clinical applications relevant to the needs of developing countries.

The European Council adopted the Programme for Action: Accelerated action on HIV/AIDS, malaria and tuberculosis in the context of poverty reduction (COM (2001)96) on 15 May 2001, following its launch by the European Commission. The Commission proposal was adopted on 16 June 2003 by the Council and the European Parliament. The Programme was to be based on three central pillars: "the impact of existing interventions, the affordability of key pharmaceuticals and trade, and the research and development of specific global public goods." These aims relate specifically with the EU stance on access to essential medicines.

Projects and activities

EDCTP-funded activities are based on:

 North/North networking and co-ordination

Partnerships among the EU and associated countries, allowing focused collaboration of national and European efforts that were not previously coordinated.

 North/South networking and co-ordination

Partnerships among EU and developing countries that focuses specifically on developing countries' needs, who are jointly involved in setting the research priorities.

 South/South networking and co-ordination

Efforts aimed at creating lasting long-term partnerships between African scientists and research institutions in Africa.

 Supporting relevant clinical trials

Acceleration of the development of new or improved drugs, vaccines and microbicides against HIV/AIDS, malaria and tuberculosis, with a focus on phase II and III clinical trials in sub-Saharan Africa.

 Capacity building

Manifested as a general strengthening of clinical research capacity in Africa, including training activities, workshops and meetings, and the upgrading of clinical trial sites in Africa.

Funding

The total budget of the EDCTP is €600 million for the period 2003–2007, of which one third (€200 million) is to be provided by the EU budget, an equivalent amounts from Member States' activities, and the remaining €200 million from industry, charities, and private organisations. The Partnership is intended to be a long-term initiative (10–20 years) and a separate legal entity has been created to maintain its independence and flexibility.

Taken together, clinical trials based in developing countries where the diseases are endemic, capacity building, and South-South networking are expected to make up over 90% of the overall budget. (figure).

Member states and partners 

 Europe
 EU member states, plus Norway and Switzerland .

 Developing countries
 All sub-Saharan African countries.

 Industry and commercial
 Bayer
 GlaxoSmithKline
 Novartis Pharma
 Novo Nordisk
 Sanofi Pasteur
 Sanofi-Aventis.

 International initiatives
 The World Health Organization (WHO-TDR)
 Drugs for Neglected Diseases initiative (http://www.dndi.org)
 International Aids Vaccine Initiative (IAVI) (http://www.iavi.org)
 European Vaccine Initiative (EVI) (http://www.euvaccine.eu)
 TB Alliance (http://www.tballiance.org)

 Private non-profit organisations
 Aeras Global TB Vaccine Foundation (https://web.archive.org/web/20090318151237/http://www.aeras.org/home/home.php)
 The Bill and Melinda Gates Foundation (https://web.archive.org/web/20121012112446/http://www.gatesfoundation.org/Pages/home.aspx)
 International Partnership for Microbicides (https://web.archive.org/web/20071008192438/http://www.ipm-microbicides.org/)
 Medicines for Malaria Venture (https://web.archive.org/web/20090214212631/http://www.mmv.org/index.php)
 The Wellcome Trust (http://www.wellcome.ac.uk)

Representatives

High representative - Pascoal Mocumbi

Executive director - Charles Mgone

See also 
 European Organisation for Research and Treatment of Cancer (EORTC)
 European Medicines Agency (EMEA)

External links 
 European and Developing Countries Clinical Trials Partnership (EDCTP)

Clinical research
International medical and health organizations
National agencies for drug regulation
Medical and health organisations based in the Netherlands